Boyd v. United States, 116 U.S. 616 (1886), was a decision by the United States Supreme Court, in which the Court held that “a search and seizure [was] equivalent [to] a compulsory production of a man's private papers” and that the search was “an 'unreasonable search and seizure' within the meaning of the Fourth Amendment.”

Background
Thirty-five cases of plate glass were seized at the Port of New York for not paying import duties. To prove the case, the government compelled E.A. Boyd & Sons to produce their invoice from the Union Plate Glass Company of Liverpool, England. Boyd complied but claimed the order was a form of self-incrimination.

Decision 
In the published opinion, after citing Lord Camden's judgment in Entick v Carrington, 19 How. St. Tr. 1029, Justice Bradley said (630):

Although not expressly overruled, some aspects of the Supreme Court's opinion in Boyd have been limited or negated by subsequent Supreme Court decisions. For example, in the case of Fisher v. United States in 1976, the Supreme Court stated:

The proposition that the Fifth Amendment prevents compelled production of documents over objection that such production might incriminate stems from Boyd v. United States, 116 U.S. 616 (1886)..... Among its several pronouncements, Boyd was understood to declare that the seizure, under warrant or otherwise, of any purely evidentiary materials violated the Fourth Amendment and that the Fifth Amendment rendered these seized materials inadmissible. .... Several of Boyd's express or implicit declarations have not stood the test of time. The application of the Fourth Amendment to subpoenas was limited by Hale v. Henkel, 201 U.S. 43 (1906), and more recent cases. See, e. g., Oklahoma Press Pub. Co. v. Walling, 327 U.S. 186 (1946). Purely evidentiary (but "nontestimonial") materials, as well as contraband and fruits and instrumentalities of crime, may now be searched for and seized under proper circumstances, .... Also, any notion that "testimonial" evidence may never be seized and used in evidence is inconsistent with Katz v. United States, 389 U.S. 347 (1967); Osborn v. United States, 385 U.S. 323 (1966); and Berger v. New York, 388 U.S. 41 (1967), approving the seizure under appropriate circumstances of conversations of a person suspected of crime. See also Marron v. United States, 275 U.S. 192 (1927)...... It is also clear that the Fifth Amendment does not independently proscribe the compelled production of every sort of incriminating evidence but applies only when the accused is compelled to make a testimonial communication that is incriminating.....

See also
List of United States Supreme Court cases, volume 116
Mere evidence rule
Exclusionary rule
Griswold v. Connecticut (1965) (also involving "the privacies of life")
Andresen v. Maryland (1976)
Payton v. New York (1980) (citing Boyd)
United States v. Hubbell (2000)

References

Further reading

External links

United States Supreme Court cases
United States Fourth Amendment case law
1886 in United States case law
United States grand jury case law
United States Supreme Court cases of the Waite Court
Port of New York and New Jersey